Prayagpur is a census town in the Kanksa CD block in the Durgapur subdivision of the Paschim Bardhaman district in the Indian state of West Bengal.

Geography

Urbanisation
According to the 2011 census, 79.22% of the population of the Durgapur subdivision was urban and 20.78% was rural. The sole municipal corporation in the Durgapur subdivision is located at Durgapur and the subdivision has 38 (+1 partly) census towns (partly presented in the map alongside; all places marked on the map are linked in the full-screen map).

Demographics
According to the 2011 Census of India, Prayagpur had a total population of 4,479, of which 2,254 (51%) were males and 2,225 (49%) were females. Population in the age range 0–6 years was 439. The total number of literate persons in Prayagpur was 3,307 (81.86% of the population over 6 years).

 India census, Prayagpur had a population of 5149. Males constitute 52% of the population and females 48%. Prayagpur has an average literacy rate of 66%, higher than the national average of 59.5%: male literacy is 75%, and female literacy is 57%. In Prayagpur, 13% of the population is under 6 years of age.

Infrastructure

According to the District Census Handbook 2011, Bardhaman, Prayagpur covered an area of 2.59 km2. Among the civic amenities, it had 11 km roads, with both open and covered drains, the protected water-supply involved tap water from treated source, hand pump. It had 700 domestic electric connections. Among the medical facilities it had 1 dispensary/ health centre, 4 medicine shops. Among the educational facilities it had was 1 primary schools, other school facilities at Kanksa 6 km away. It had 1 non-formal education centre (Sarva Shiksha Abhiyan). Among the social, recreational, cultural facilities it had 1 public library and 1 reading room.

Education
Prayagpur has one primary school.

Healthcare
Panagarh Rural Hospital, with 30 beds, at Panagarh, is the major government medical facility in the Kanksa CD block.

References

Cities and towns in Paschim Bardhaman district